Michel Léveillé is a Canadian ice hockey coach and former center who was a two-time All-American for Maine.

Career
Léveillé was a late-blooming junior player, not participating in a high-level league until he was 19. In his final season of junior eligibility, Léveillé's point total exploded and he averaged more than two points per game with the Nanaimo Clippers. Léveillé was forced to play senior hockey for a year before he could join the ice hockey team at Maine, but his freshman year was well worth the wait. He was nearly a point-per-game player for the year and was named the Hockey East Rookie of the Year. He helped the team finish second in the conference and than capture the Hockey East Championship. Maine received the #3 overall seed and marched through the NCAA Tournament. Léveillé's only goal was an important one as it tied a game late and allowed the Black Bears to overcome an early deficit to Harvard. The team reached the championship game for the 5th time in program history, but the offense failed and they fell 0–1 to Denver.

With Léveillé already being 23 at the start of his sophomore season (older than some seniors), he was named as an alternate captain. His goal production doubled in year two, but the team declined significantly and his point production suffered as a result. The Black Bears recovered in 2006 and Léveillé averaged more than point per game. He was named to the All-American team and pushed the team back up to a 2nd-place finish in Hockey East. Maine had another successful run in the NCAA Tournament, reaching their 10th Frozen Four. Léveillé was named team captain in his final year and was again an All-American. The team had mixed results in postseason play but did return to the Frozen Four. After Maine was eliminated, Léveillé finished the year with the Toronto Marlies.

For Léveillé's first full season as a professional, he spent most of his time in the AHL but couldn't establish himself as a consistent scorer. After getting demoted to the ECHL the following year, he spent the entire 2010 season at the AA-level. After the season, he travelled to Germany and played three seasons in the 2nd national league. In 2013 Léveillé returned to Quebec and played one season for a low-level pro league before hanging up his skates.

Léveillé began his coaching career the following season, working for the North American Hockey Academy for two years. In 2017 he returned to Maine and became a coach for the Maine Wild, a youth hockey organization.

Career statistics

Regular season and playoffs

Awards and honors

References

External links

1981 births
Living people
AHCA Division I men's ice hockey All-Americans
Canadian ice hockey centres
Ice hockey people from Quebec
People from Lévis, Quebec
Maine Black Bears men's ice hockey players
Toronto Marlies players
Columbia Inferno players
Manchester Monarchs (AHL) players
Charlotte Checkers (1993–2010) players
Heilbronner Falken players
Saint-Georges Cool FM 103.5 players